Xavier Gélin (21 June 1946 – 2 July 1999) was a French actor and film producer, and son of French film star Daniel Gélin and actress-producer Danièle Delorme. Through his father, he was a half-brother of Fiona Gélin and Maria Schneider, also actresses. Gélin, a French actor and a mainstay of popular French cinema for more than three decades, died of cancer at the age of 53.

He played supporting roles in more than 20 films, including Gerard Oury's 1973 comic hit "The Adventures of Rabbi Jacob" with Louis de Funes. He also starred in Claude Lelouche's "Adventure, It's Adventure" and "The Devil by the Tail" by Phillippe de Broca. Other hits include Claude Pinoteau's "The Slap" and "The Party-2."

Filmography

1964: Cherchez l'idole - Un invité au spectacle de Sylvie Vartan (uncredited)
1967: Mise à sac - Michel Castagnier
1969: The Devil by the Tail - Charlie (Le petit garagiste)
1969: La maison de campagne - Gérard
1970: The Bear and the Doll - Reginald
1971: Macédoine - Le photographe
1971: Le juge - Antonio
1971: La ville-bidon - Un jeune cadre
1972: L'aventure, c'est l'aventure - Daniel Massaro, le fils de Lino
1972: Repeated Absences - Le 2e flic
1972: The Tall Blond Man with One Black Shoe - Young man in car hearing the toilet flushing in the florist van (uncredited)
1973: Ras le bol - Bertrand Guillou, dit Bert
1973: The Mad Adventures of Rabbi Jacob - Alexandre, le fils du général
1973: Hail the Artist - Le réalisateur énervé (uncredited)
1973: I Don't Know Much, But I'll Say Everything - Le fils à la sécurité sociale (uncredited)
1974: S*P*Y*S - Paul (Revolutionary)
1974: The Slap - Xavier
1974: The Return of the Tall Blond Man with One Black Shoe - Peintre à l'aéroport (uncredited)
1978: On peut le dire sans se fâcher - Un automobiliste
1978: Take It from the Top - Le mari
1978: A Simple Story - Denisold (uncredited)
1981: Signé Furax - Théo Courant
1982: La Boum 2 - Gilles (uncredited)
1989: Les cigognes n'en font qu'à leur tête - Le cuisinier (uncredited)
1990: Promotion canapé - Un proxénéte (uncredited)
1992: My Wife's Girlfriends - TV channel manager
1993: Coup de jeune - Un collègue de Anne-Christine (uncredited)
1993: Roulez jeunesse! - Jean's son

References

External links

1946 births
1999 deaths
Deaths from cancer in France
French film directors
French film producers
Male actors from Paris
French male film actors
French male television actors
20th-century French male actors